Without Limits is a 1998 American biographical sports film. It is  written and directed by Robert Towne and follows the relationship between record-breaking distance runner Steve Prefontaine and his coach Bill Bowerman, who later co-founded Nike, Inc. Billy Crudup plays Prefontaine and Donald Sutherland plays Bowerman. It also stars Monica Potter, Jeremy Sisto, Judith Ivey, Matthew Lillard and William Mapother.

The film was produced by Tom Cruise (Cruise and Mapother are cousins) and Paula Wagner, and released and distributed by Warner Bros. Due to a very low-key promotional campaign, the $25 million film grossed only $777,000 at the box office, although it received good reviews from many major critics. Sutherland received a Golden Globe nomination for Best Supporting Actor for his performance in the film.

Cast
 Billy Crudup as Steve Prefontaine
 Donald Sutherland as Bill Bowerman
 Monica Potter as Mary Marckx
 Jeremy Sisto as Frank Shorter
 Judith Ivey as Barbara Bowerman
 Dean Norris as Bill Dellinger
 Billy Burke as Kenny Moore
 Frank Shorter as Fred Long
 Matthew Lillard as Roscoe Devine
 William Mapother as Bob Peters
 Amy Jo Johnson as Iowa's Finest
 Lisa Banes as Elfriede Prefontaine
 William Friedkin as TV Director
 Erich Anderson as Collin Pounder

Production

Development
20 years prior to the film's release, Kenny Moore, a friend of late Steve Prefontaine, approached Robert Towne with the intention of making a film about Prefontaine but Towne was unavailable at the time. Three years later,  the two worked together on the film Personal Best and they again explored the idea. In 1994, the two met and Moore began writing a script for Towne to direct. Mary Marckx, Prefontaine's former girlfriend and friend of Moore, gave Towne over 200 personal letters written by Prefontaine, which provided an insight into his thoughts and she also shared information on the relationship he had with his mother. Explaining how Tom Cruise got involved in the project, Moore said:

Casting
Towne originally envisioned Cruise in the role of Prefontaine, but it was decided he was too old. For the role, Billy Crudup who had been a college athlete trained for four months with Patrice Donnelly (she starred in Personal Best) to run short distances as he was expected to run 110 to 200 yards for a 5,000 meter race sequence. He also watched actual footage of Prefontaine to imitate his moves. Tommy Lee Jones, Harrison Ford and Clint Eastwood were considered for the part of Bowerman but they all turned it down and Donald Sutherland eventually landed the role. Monica Potter played the role of Prefontaine's girlfriend and spent a lot of time with Mary Marckx to prepare for the part.

Filming

The film was shot on location in Oregon using the University of Oregon's Hayward Field. Scenes were also filmed at Heceta Beach, Oregon. Bill Bowerman's house served as a shooting location. After two months of filming in Oregon, the production moved to Los Angeles to film the Munich sequences at Citrus College. Some visuals of the Munich Olympics came from the documentary Visions of Eight:

Reception
Without Limits met with positive reviews from critics. On review aggregator Rotten Tomatoes, the film holds a 79% "fresh" approval rating with an average score of 6.6/10, based on 38 reviews. The website's consensus reads: "This drama about American track star and hero Steve Prefontaine intelligently looks at the character of this oft mythologized athlete and features a fantastic performance by Donald Sutherland as Prefontaine's trainer."

See also
Prefontaine (film)

References

External links
 

1990s English-language films
1990s sports films
1990s biographical drama films
American biographical drama films
Films set in the 1960s
Films set in the 1970s
American track and field films
Biographical films about sportspeople
Biographical films about educators
Cultural depictions of track and field athletes
Cultural depictions of American men
Films about the 1972 Summer Olympics
Films about Olympic track and field
Sports films based on actual events
Films set in Oregon
Films shot in Oregon
Films shot in Eugene, Oregon
Films shot in Los Angeles
Films directed by Robert Towne
Cruise/Wagner Productions films
Warner Bros. films
Films with screenplays by Robert Towne
Films produced by Tom Cruise
1998 drama films
1998 films
1990s American films